Kostolná pri Dunaji (meaning Church Tree, meaning "Churchville by the Danube") is a village and municipality in western Slovakia in  Senec District in the Bratislava Region.

Geography
The municipality lies at an altitude of 128 metres and covers an area of 8.072 km².

History
In historical records the village was first mentioned in 1332.
After the Austro-Hungarian army disintegrated in November 1918, Czechoslovak troops liberated the area, later acknowledged internationally by the Treaty of Trianon. Between 1938 and 1945 Kostolná pri Dunaji once more became occupied by Miklós Horthy's Hungary through the First Vienna Award. From 1945 until the Velvet Divorce, it was part of Czechoslovakia. Since then it has been part of Slovakia.

Population
According to the 2011 census, the municipality had 508 inhabitants. 265 of inhabitants were Hungarians, 235 Slovaks and 8 others and unspecified.

See also
 List of municipalities and towns in Slovakia

References

Genealogical resources

The records for genealogical research are available at the state archive "Statny Archiv in Bratislava, Slovakia"

 Roman Catholic church records (births/marriages/deaths): 1711-1898 (parish A)

External links/Sources

https://web.archive.org/web/20070513023228/http://www.statistics.sk/mosmis/eng/run.html
Surnames of living people in Kostolna pri Dunaji

Villages and municipalities in Senec District
Hungarian communities in Slovakia